Hill River is a river in the Wheatbelt region of Western Australia.

Geography

The river has four tributaries; Coomallo Creek, Winjardie Creek, Munbinea Creek and Boothendara Creek.

History
The river was seen and named by the explorer George Grey on 14 April 1839 during his second disastrous expedition along the Western Australian coast.

It was likely named after Rowland Hill, well known for his inception of the Uniform Penny Post, but importantly for Grey, Secretary to the Colonization Commissioners for South Australia (under the South Australia Act 1834). Grey's friend and promoter William Hutt M.P. was also a Commissioner. In the previous week, Grey had also named rivers after Hutt,  Hutt's wife Mary Bowes, Hutt's business partner John Chapman and Charles Buller M.P., an active parliamentary proponent of the free colonization of South Australia. In October 1840, at 28 years of age, Grey was appointed Governor of South Australia.

Uses
The mouth of the Hill River is a popular camping destination and can be reached in a two-wheel drive vehicle. The river mouth is usually closed to the ocean by a sandbar, which opens up in periods of high river flow.

References

External links
 Hill River

Rivers of the Wheatbelt region